Panaspis thomensis, the São Tomé leaf-litter skink, is a species of lidless skinks in the family Scincidae. The species is found on São Tomé.

References

Panaspis
Reptiles described in 2018
Reptiles of Ethiopia
Endemic fauna of Ethiopia
Taxa named by Luis M. P. Ceríaco
Taxa named by Leonor B. Soares
Taxa named by Mariana P. Marques
Taxa named by Cristiane Bastos-Silveira
Taxa named by Lauren A. Scheinberg
Taxa named by David James Harris
Taxa named by António Brehm
Taxa named by José Jesus